Lady Cui or Cuishi (崔氏) was a Chinese noblewoman of the Cui clan of Qinghe from the Cao Wei state during the Three Kingdoms period. She was the wife of Cao Zhi, a prince of Cao Wei and Cao Cao's son. She is best known for the incident that led to her death, Cuishi wore embroidered clothes to a ceremony and was seen by Cao Cao who later forced her to commit suicide because she violated a rule with her dress code. She dressed as the Crown Princess after a dispute over succession to the throne between Cao Zhi and Cao Pi, resulting in the latter's coronation.

Biography 
Cuishi was born into the Cui clan of Qinghe in Qinghe Commandery. The Cui clan was an eminent Chinese family of high government officials and Confucian scholars. She was the niece of Cui Yan, a politician who served under Yuan Shao and later Cao Cao, the King of Wei. She married Cao Zhi, a prince and famous poet, who was embroiled in a succession dispute over the leadership of Wei with his half-brother Cao Pi. Cao Cao once called Lady Cui's uncle to ask for an opinion on who should succeed him. Cao Cao considered making Cao Zhi heir and expected Cui Yan to support him on Lady Cui's behalf, but Cui Yan surprised him by saying that he should make Cao Pi his successor as he was the eldest son.

In 216, in an incident widely regarded as a case of grievous injustice, Cui Yan was accused of defaming Cao Cao in a letter and ended up being stripped of his post, thrown into prison and subsequently forced to commit suicide. 

During this time, Cao Cao became reluctant to Cao Zhi due to his bad behavior, such as the incident in the city of Ye where Cao Zhi walked drunk through the gate reserved only for the emperor. A close friend of Cao Zhi, Yang Xiu, tried to help him by leaking the council discussion agenda to Cao Zhi so that his friend could prepare beforehand and impress Cao Cao. When Cao Cao learned of this, he had Yang Xiu executed in 219.

The Wei-Jin Shiyu records that once Cao Cao caught Lady Cui wearing clothes that were too extravagant and superior to her status, violating the law, as punishment she was forced to commit suicide. According to this source, Lady Cui was dressed as Crown Princess (consort of the Crown Prince), which was seen as an affront as the succession discussion had ended in favor of Cao Pi as Crown Prince, so she was killed to prevent any further opposition. The law Lady Cui violated was one of many designed to combat growing political corruption, as many people were dressing above their position to gain privileges. 

At the same time, Cao Cao had already decided to pass the throne to Cao Pi, and Cuishi's death was a form of suppression of Cao Zhi, relatively weakening his power and support. It is unknown whether Lady Cui's death was shortly after her uncle. Cao Zhi, who became known as one of the most influential poets, wrote several poems mourning her death. The reason for Yang Xiu's death, as well as Lady Cui's, is often answered by their proximity to Cao Zhi; although it is also justified by Yang Xiu knowing Cao Cao's inner thinking and cruelly ambitious nature. 

In 220 Cao Cao dies and a brief dispute ensues between Cao Pi, Cao Zhang (another son of Cao Cao and Empress Dowager Bian) and Cao Zhi; resulting in Cao Pi being crowned as Lady Cui's uncle recommended. Cao Zhi was banned from engaging in politics, and shortly afterwards Cao Zhang passed away, possibly poisoned byy Cao Pi.

Cao Zhi had two sons — Cao Miao and Cao Zhi and two daughters — Cao Jinhu and Cao Xingnü. It is not known whether Cao Zhi's four children were born to Lady Cui or not.

Appraisal 
The condemnations of Cui clan members are considered to be unjust. Yi Zhongtian a contemporary historian said ''Cui Yan used his death to prove he was a gentleman. Cao Cao used Cui Yan's death to prove he was a traitor''.

References

Bibliography 

 Pei, Songzhi (5th century). Annotations to Records of the Three Kingdoms (Sanguozhi zhu).

 Chen, Shou (3rd century). Records of the Three Kingdoms (Sanguozhi).

2nd-century Chinese women
2nd-century Chinese people
3rd-century Chinese women
3rd-century Chinese people
Cao Cao and associates
Family of Cao Cao